The National Workers' Union  is a trade union in Dominica.  It is affiliated with the International Trade Union Confederation.

References

Trade unions in Dominica
International Trade Union Confederation